Erhard Rahm (born 1959) is a German computer scientist  and professor at the University of Leipzig. 
His research areas are  database systems, data integration and Big Data.

Biography
Rahm studied computer science at Kaiserslautern University of Technology from 1979 to 1984 where he also earned his Ph.D. in 1988. From 1988 to 1989 he was a post-doc at the IBM Thomas J. Watson Research Center in Hawthorne. He was an assistant professor at Kaiserslautern University of Technology from 1989 to 1994 and received the Venia legendi in 1993. Since 1994 he is a full professor for databases at the University of Leipzig. He spent extended research visits at Microsoft Research in Redmond (WA) and the Australian National University.

Selected publications  
.
.
.

Selected awards 
 VLDB 10-Year Best Paper Award 2011  with Jayant Madhavan and Phil Bernstein,
 ICDE Influential Paper Award 2013  with Sergey Melnik and Hector Garcia-Molina

References

External links 
 Homepage of Erhard Rahm at University of Leipzig
  Publications in the Digital Bibliography & Library Project
 Publications in Google Scholar
 Entry for Erhard Rahm in Mathematics Genealogy Project

Living people
1959 births
German computer scientists
Computer science educators
Database researchers
Academic staff of Leipzig University
Technical University of Kaiserslautern alumni